The Diocese of Sonsonate is a Latin Church ecclesiastical territory or diocese of the Catholic Church in El Salvador. It is a suffragan diocese in the ecclesiastical province of the metropolitan Archdiocese of San Salvador. The Diocese of Sonsonate was erected on 31 May 1986.

Ordinaries
José Carmen Di Pietro Pésolo, S.D.B. (1986–1989)
José Adolfo Mojica Morales (1989–2011)
Fabio Reynaldo Colindres Abarca (2011–2012); Apostolic Administrator "ad nutum Sanctae Sedis"; concurrently Military Ordinary of El Salvador
Constantino Barrera Morales (2012–present); Bishop-elect; formerly Rector of the Salvadoran National Major Seminary, "San Jose de la Montana"

References

External links
 

Sonsonate
Sonsonate
Sonsonate
1986 establishments in El Salvador
Roman Catholic Ecclesiastical Province of San Salvador